Matt Mattox (August 16, 1921 – February 18, 2013) was an American jazz and ballet dancer. He was a Broadway performer and a specialty dancer in many Hollywood musicals. His best-known film role was as Caleb Pontipee in the 1954 film Seven Brides for Seven Brothers.

After his Broadway and film career, Mattox moved to Europe, where he became a well-respected dance teacher.

Birth and career
Mattox was born in  Tulsa, Oklahoma, and became a protégé of the legendary jazz dance pioneer Jack Cole, with whom he worked on Broadway in Magdalena: a Musical Adventure (1948). His other Broadway credits include creating the role of the Jester in the original production of Once Upon a Mattress (1959), and Harry Beaton in the 1957 revival of Brigadoon.  Mattox also performed concert engagements with his own dance company. His brief career as a Broadway choreographer included Jennie and Say, Darling.

Mattox used his background in ballet technique to create his own technique for jazz dance. His jazz class was assembled in the progression of a ballet class, and he called his exercises "the barre". Mattox also specifically designed the exercises to relate to the combinations given at the end of his class. The positions, shapes, and qualities developed during the barre are visible within his own detailed and polished style.

Mattox had a higher profile as a specialty dancer in Hollywood musicals. His best-known film role is Caleb Pontipee in Seven Brides for Seven Brothers, but he was also a principal dancer in, among others, Yolanda and the Thief, The Band Wagon (Cyd Charisse's partner in the ballet sequence), Till the Clouds Roll By, Gentlemen Prefer Blondes, and There's No Business Like Show Business. In addition, Mattox was a regular guest on television variety shows, for which he choreographed as well as performed, including ''The Patti Page Oldsmobile Show," 1958-59.

One of the world's most influential teachers of jazz dance—or, as he called it, "freestyle dancing"— Mattox lived and worked in Perpignan, France. He formed a concert jazz dance company in 1975 in England and eventually brought it to France.

References

External links
 
 
 Dance Magazine interview (2003)
 Matt Mattox profile on arts•meme
 Dance Magazine obituary
 Dance Advantage biography

1921 births
2013 deaths
Male actors from Tulsa, Oklahoma
American jazz dancers
American male dancers
American choreographers
American male musical theatre actors
20th-century American male actors